The Apokpa Marup or the Apokpa Laining is a modern religious denomination of Sanamahism, the primitive Meitei religion or Meiteism, founded by Laininghal Naoriya Phulo in 1930 in Cachar, Assam. It was founded in the goal of reviving the suppressed old paganism of the Meitei ethnicity in the then Manipur.

See also
 Sanamahism
 Sanamahi creation myth
Lists of deities in Sanamahism
Lists of Creatures in Meitei Folklore

References 

Meitei culture
Sanamahism